Bayerischer Kunstförderpreis is a Bavarian arts and literary prize.

Selected winners
Source:

2002 

Performing arts

 Stefanie Dietrich (actress)
 Barbara Schöller (actress)
 Christian Hettkamp (actor)
 Marc Oliver Schulze (actor)

2004 

Performing Arts

 Brigitte Hobmeier (Actress)
 Nina Kunzendorf (Actress)
 Thomas Loibl (Actor)
 Stefan Sevenich (Singer)

Fine Arts

 Karin Bergdolt
 Martin Fengel
 Marco Schuler
 Wolfgang Stehle
 Cora Piantoni (Special category: Photography)

Music and Dance

 Sunday Night Orchestra (Bigband)
 Martin Rasch (Pianist)
 Minas Borboudakis (Composer)
 Avetik Karapetyan (Dancer)
 Ilja Sarkisov (Dancer)

Literature

 Ewald Arenz
 Claudia Klischat
 Wieland Freund

2005 

Performing Arts

 Bettina Schmidt (actress)
 Sabina von Walther
 Dieter Fischer (actor)
 Robert Joseph Bartl

Fine Arts

 Heike Döscher
 Martina Salzberger
 Richard Schur
 Peter Senoner

Music and Dance

 Ivy Amista (Dancer)
 Michael Wollny (Pianist)
 Dessi Slava Kepenerova (Drummer)
 Joachim F.W. Schneider (Composer)

Literature

 Lena Gorelik
 Jens Petersen
 Volker Klüpfel
 Michael Kobr

2006 

Performing Arts

 Marina Galic (Actress)
 Maximilian Brückner (Actor)
 Silke Evers (Singer)
 Daniela Sindram (Singer)

Fine Arts

 Ingrid Floss (Painter)
 Veronika Veit (Sculptor)
 Christian Hiegle (Painter)
 Michael Schrattenthaler (Installation Artist)
 Florian Tuercke (Performance Artist)

Music and Dance

 Claus Raible (Pianist)
 Laura Konjetzky (Pianist)
 Alessandro Sousa Pereira (Dancer)
 Marko Zdralek (Composer)

Literature

 Katja Huber (Writer)
 Nuran David Calis (Playwright)
 Nora Gomringer (Lyricist)

2007 

Performing Arts

 Katharina Schubert (Actress)
 Aurel Bereuter (Actor)
 Marco Steeger (Actor)
 Tilmann Unger (Tenor)

Fine Arts

 Annegret Hoch (Painter)
 Thorsten Franck (Furniture Designer)
 Axel Gercke (Painter)
 Alfred Kurz (Sculptor)
 Stefan Wischnewski (Sculptor)

Music and Dance

 Veronika Eberle (Violinist)
 Alexander Muno (Composer)
 Daniel Zaboj (Choreographer)
 Kammermusikensemble Piano Ensemble

Literature

 Maximilian Dorner (Writer)
 Daniel Grohn (Writer)
 Thomas von Steinaecker (Writer)
 Nikolai Vogel und Kilian Fitzpatrick (Authors)

2008 

Performing arts

 Sophia Brommer (Sopranistin)
 Reto Raphael Rosin (Tenor)
 Felix Rech (actor)
 Judith Toth (actress)

Fine arts

 Sebastian Kuhn (Bildhauer)
 Oh-Seok Kwon (Bildhauer)
 Petra Schneider (Fotografin)
 Lorenz Straßl (Fotograf)
 Nicki Marquardt (Hutmacherin) - Spezialpreis -

Music and dance

 Caroline Matthiessen (dancer)
 Philipp Weiss (Jazz singer)
 VoicesInTime (Rock- & Jazzchor)
 Duo d'Accord - Lucia Huang und Sebastian Euler (Klavierduo)

Literature

 Karin Fellner (Lyrikerin)
 Stefanie Geiger (Schriftstellerin)
 Luis Ruby (Übersetzer)

2009 

Performing arts

 Stephanie Hampl (Mezzosopranistin)
 Heidi Elisabeth Meier (Sopranistin)
 Shenja Lacher (actor)
 Michael Stange (actor)

Fine arts

 Lena Bröcker (artist)
 Florian Haller (Maler)
 Dashdemed Sampil (Maler)
 Katharina Gaenssler (Fotografin)
 Ladislav Zajac (Bühnenbildner) - Spezialpreis -

Music and dance

 Christine Ceconello (dancer)
 Markus Elsner (Dirigent und Musiker)
 Andreas Kurz (Kontrabassist)
 David Theodor Schmidt (Pianist)

Literature

 Beate Teresa Hanika (Schriftstellerin)
 Anja Utler (Lyrikerin)
 Benedict Wells (Schriftsteller)

2010 

Performing arts

 Julia Bartolome (actress)
 Sibylla Duffe (Sopranistin)
 Jan Friedrich Eggers (Bariton)
 Nico Holonics (actor)

Fine arts

 Susu Gorth (artist)
 Eva-Maria Raschpichler (artist)
 Christian Schnurer (Künstler)
 Frank Stürmer (Fotograf)
 Carlos de Abreu (Künstler) - Spezialpreis -

Music and dance

 Herbert Schuch (Pianist)
 Saúl Vega (Tänzer)
 Double Drums (Schlagzeug-Duo Alexander Glöggler und Philipp Jungk)
 Alex Wienand Trio (Jazztrio mit Alexander Wienand, Felix Himmler und Tobias Schirmer)

Literature

 Stephan Knösel für den Jugendroman Echte Cowboys
 Tom Schulz für den Lyrikband Kanon vor dem Verschwinden
 Benjamin Stein für den Roman Die Leinwand

2011 

Performing arts

 Hrachuhí Bassénz (singer)
 Monika Lichtenegger (singer)
 Maria Vogt (actress)
 Lucy Wirth (actress)

Literature

 Katharina Eyssen für ihren Debütroman Alles Verbrecher
 Veronika Rotfuß für ihren Jugendroman Mücke im März
 Max Scharnigg für den Roman Die Besteigung der Eiger-Nordwand unter einer Treppe

Fine arts

 Duo Matthias Böhler / Christian Orendt (Installationskünstler)
 Alexander Laner (Bildhauer)
 Emanuel Seitz  (Maler)
 Susanne Wagner (Videoartist)
 Christoph Kienzle  (Designer, Illustrator)

Music and dance

 Gözde Özgür (dancer)
 Jaione Zabala (dancer)
 William Youn (Pianist)
 Alexander von Hagke (Saxophonist, Klarinettist, Komponist)

2012–present

Fine art
 2012: Michael Biber; Beate Engl; Simona Koch; Clea Stracke und Verena Seibt; Leonie Felle; Anna Witt
 2013: Alexander Hick; Martin Hotter; Silke Markefka; Maitra Wakil; Justin Almquist; Tim Wolff
 2014: Boban Andjelkovic; Felix Burger; Hedwig Eberle; Jasmin Schmidt; Elisabeth Wieser
 2015: Gabi Blum; Matthias Glas; Philipp Gufler; Andreas Peiffer
 2016: Jakob Egenrieder; Miho Kasama; Funda Gül Özcan; Felix Leon Westner; Anna McCarthy
 2017: Florentin Berner; Andreas Chwatal; Michael Seidner; Johannes Tassilo Walter; Christoph Weißhaar
 2018: Claudia Barcheri; Sebastian Dacey; Sophia Süßmilch; Benjamin Zuber; Easy!upstream (Susi Gelb, Niko Abramidis, Quirin Brunnmeier); Edel Extra (Susanne Wohlfahrt, Claudia Holzinger, Lilly Urbat); Prince of Wales (Jonas von Ostrowsky, Leo Lencés)
 2019: Izabela Tarasewicz; Alexandros Tsioris; Jonas Tröger; Sebastian Tröger; Cana Bilir-Meier
 2020: Stephan Janitzky; Irina Ojovan; Paula Leal Olloqui; Lea von Wintzingerode; Künstlerduo Viola Relle und Raphael Weilguni

Literature
 2012 Lydia Daher, Christian Lorenz Müller, Elias Wagner
 2013 Martin Beyer, Jonas Lüscher, Christian Schloyer
 2014 Kenah Cusanit, Joshua Groß, Susanne Krones, Manuel Niedermeier
 2015 Silke Kleemann, Lilian Loke, Tobias Roth, Barbara Yelin
 2016 Pierre Jarawan, Mercedes Lauenstein, Jan Schönherr
 2017 Pierre-Henri Campbell, Mara-Daria Cojocaru, Kristina Pfister
 2018 Helwig Arenz, Anne Freytag, Dominik Wendland
 2019 Katharina Adler, Tristan Marquardt, Nora Zapf, Benedikt Feiten
 2020 Lisa Frühbeis, Lisa Jeschke, Dana von Suffin, Andreas Thamm

Music and dance
 2012 Max Zachrisson (Tanz), Stefanie Schumacher (Akkordeon), Andreas Mildner (Harfe), INDEX Ensemble (Musikerinnen und Musiker)
 2013 Wlademir Faccioni (Tanz), Tim Allhoff (Jazz-Piano und Komposition), Alexander Schimpf (Klavier), Christian Elin (Tenor-Saxophon)
 2014 Marina Miguélez (Tanz), Monika Roscher (E-Gitarre, Jazz-Komposition), Johannes X. Schachtner (Komposition, Dirigieren), Maximilian Hornung (Cello)
 2015 Jonah Cook (Tanz), Theophilus Jeremias Veselý (Tanz), Leo Betzl (Jazz-Piano, Jazz-Komposition), Goldmund Quartett (Streichensemble)
 2016 Sayaka Kado (Tanz), Arcis Saxophon Quartett (Saxophonensemble), Christian Elsässer Jazz Orchestra (Jazzensemble), Benno Schachtner (Countertenor)
 2017 Vivi Vassileva (Percussion), Rebekka Trescher/Ensemble 11 (Jazz), Moritz Stahl (Saxophone), Johannes Öllinger (Gitarre)
 2018 Matthias Lindermayr (Jazz-Trompete), Henrik Ajax (Komposition, Piano), Gregor A. Mayrhofer (Dirigent, Komposition, Pianist), Rachelle Scott (Tanz)
 2019 Alexsandro Akapohi (Tanz), Raphaela Gromes (Cello), Angela Metzger (Orgel), “Verworner Krause Kammerorchester - VKKO” (Ensemble)
 2020 Sofie Vervaecke (Tanz), Aris Alexander Blettenberg (Pianist, Dirigent und Komponist), Johanna Soller (Dirigentin), Gustavo Strauß – Paranormal String Quartet (Jazz)

Performing arts
 2012 Betsy Horne, Tilman Lidchi, Genija Rykova, Andrea Wenzl
 2013 Josephine Köhler, Friederike Ott, Xenia Tiling, Verena Semieniuk
 2014 Anna-Maria Thoma, Anna Drexler, Cathrin Lange, Franz Pätzold
 2015 Danae Kontora, Jakob Keller, Ludwig Mittelhammer, Valery Tscheplanowa

References

Literary awards of Bavaria